Institute of Contemporary Art San Francisco (ICA SF) is an American contemporary art museum that opened in October 2022, and is located in the Dogpatch neighborhood of San Francisco, California. Admission is free.

About 
The Institute of Contemporary Art San Francisco is a non-collecting institution with a 11,000-square-foot gallery space that opened in October 2022, funded through Silicon Valley-based donors. Donors of the opening of ICA SF included Deborah and Andy Rappaport, Pamela and David Hornik, and Kaitlyn and Mike Krieger. The space was designed after the European kunsthalle, specializing in displaying temporary, boundary-pushing art. Ali Gass is the founding director.

The opening programming was a solo exhibition by Choctaw-Cherokee artist Jeffrey Gibson's, "This Burning World"; and a group exhibition curated by Tahirah Rasheed and Autumn Breon, of work by Oakland-based artists Liz Hernández and Ryan Whelan.

See also 
 Institute of Contemporary Art San José
 Minnesota Street Project
 Wattis Institute for Contemporary Art

References

External links 

 Official website

Art in the San Francisco Bay Area
Art museums and galleries in California
2022 establishments in California
Potrero Hill, San Francisco
Art museums and galleries in San Francisco